The 1965 Oaxaca earthquake occurred in Mexico on August 23 at  with a moment magnitude of 7.5. Five people were reported dead in Mexico City and one in Oaxaca. There was an anomalous change in seismic activities before the earthquake. There was a quiescent stage from late 1963 to mid-1964, and it was followed by a renewal of seismic activities before the main shock. This earthquake was a shallow thrust earthquake in the interplate subduction zone, in which the Cocos Plate is subducting beneath the North American Plate.

See also 
List of earthquakes in 1965
List of earthquakes in Mexico

References

External links 

Earthquakes in Mexico
Oaxaca Earthquake, 1965
1965 in Mexico
1965 disasters in Mexico